The Nature and Destiny of Man (two volumes, 1943) is one of the important works of the American theologian Reinhold Niebuhr.  The book is partly based on his 1939 Gifford Lectures. In 1998, the Modern Library ranked it the 18th-greatest non-fiction book of the 20th century.

Contents
Reinhold Niebuhr deals with profound issues such as human nature, history, and the end of history. Niebuhr begins by arguing that the Christian view of human nature, compared with alternative views, is more complete and offers more explanatory power. According to the Christian view, human beings are made in the image of God. Unlike alternative views that establish a good and bad duality between mind and body, in the Christian view, both mind and body are good because both are created by God. People are made to live in harmony with others and God's will but violate this harmony when they inevitably make themselves the center and source of meaning for their lives.

Humans have tremendous creative and imaginative powers, and their minds can transcend both themselves (since they can make their own thoughts the object of contemplation) and the natural world (since they can manipulate natural forces to create new possibilities and vitalities of nature). Because people cannot find ultimate meaning in what they can transcend, they cannot find ultimate meaning within themselves or in the natural world. This is why people turn to religion.

Christianity is a religion of revelation, meaning that Christians believe that God must speak to people in order for them to arrive at a correct understanding of the divine nature and will. If the Bible is to be believed, God spoke to people throughout history but the divine message was not clearly understood. Because of human misunderstanding, and because God's law is so radically different from human law, Jesus' message was highly offensive to his listeners. What Jesus told people is that God overcomes evil not by destroying evildoers but by taking their evil upon himself. God's love is suffering love.

To live in accordance with the law of love seems to require that people accept the reality of an existence beyond this life. If the reality of this other existence is denied, then Jesus' statement that "whoever loses his life for my sake will find it" makes no sense. Yet, people are not to despise this life. To be righteous, to a Christian, means to serve others, and believers need to strive after intermediate and partial arrangements that help point the way toward ultimate resolutions and revelations. God provides ultimate meaning. Just as the human mind can provide meaning to a sequence of chronological events by comprehending them all in an instant, so God provides meaning by comprehending all events both prospectively and retrospectively.

References

1943 non-fiction books
American non-fiction books
Charles Scribner's Sons books
Christian theology books
Works by Reinhold Niebuhr